New Hanover Township may refer to:
New Hanover Township, New Jersey
New Hanover Township, Montgomery County, Pennsylvania

Township name disambiguation pages